Javorjev Dol is a small dispersed settlement in the hills southwest of Gorenja Vas in the Municipality of Gorenja Vas–Poljane in the Upper Carniola region of Slovenia.

References

External links 

Javorjev Dol on Geopedia

Populated places in the Municipality of Gorenja vas-Poljane